A special pleader was a historical legal occupation. The practitioner, or "special pleader" in English law specialised in drafting "pleadings", in modern terminology statements of case.

History
Up to the 19th century, there were many rules, technicalities and difficulties in drafting pleadings and claims and defences could be dismissed for trivial errors. As an extreme instance, a learned judge in the 19th century challenged a pleading for putting the year without adding A.D., on the ground that "non constat that A.D. might not be intended".

Some practitioners made it their business to frame pleadings, rather than to appear in court or to write legal opinions, and were called special pleaders. They were not necessarily barristers, but might be licensed to practise under the bar. At one time it was usual to practise for a time as a special pleader before being called to the bar. The system had largely fallen into disuse as a speciality by the beginning of the 20th century, although it continues to exist in India.

Notes

References

Further reading

English law
Legal history of England
Historical legal occupations